Romany Romanic Malco Jr. (born November 18, 1968) is an American actor, voice actor, rapper, and music producer. He has been nominated for several awards, including an NAACP Image Award, MTV Movie Award, and Screen Actors Guild Award. In film, he is best known for his roles in The 40 Year-Old Virgin (2005), Baby Mama (2008), Think Like a Man (2012) and its sequel Think Like a Man Too (2014), and The DUFF (2015). In television, he is best known for portraying Conrad Shepard on the Showtime series Weeds (2005–2012) and Rome Howard on the ABC series A Million Little Things (2018–present). He is also known for writing the rap lyrics for the character of MC Skat Kat in "Opposites Attract".

Personal life
Malco was born in Brooklyn, New York. His family is from Trinidad and Tobago.

As a young boy, Malco moved to Baytown, Texas, and he attended Ross S. Sterling High School.

Malco served in the United States Marine Corps from 1987 to 1991.

In 2008, he married former ice skater Taryn Dakha, the body double for Jessica Alba. They met in 2007 on the set of the 2008 film The Love Guru.

In 2015, Malco decided to move to Puerto Rico while filming Mad Dogs there. During an interview on ABC's The Chew, Malco said he "couldn't leave" and that living on the island made him feel he was "living the dream".

In January 2021, Malco welcomed his first child, a son.

Music career
After high school graduation, Malco formed the rap group R.M.G. The group moved to Los Angeles and signed a deal with Virgin Records in 1991. The group's name was changed to College Boyz. The single "Victim of the Ghetto", off their 1992 album Radio Fusion Radio, went to #2 on the rap charts.

Malco is often mistakenly credited for performing one of the raps as MC Skat Kat on the Grammy award–winning "Opposites Attract", a duet with Paula Abdul. On October 29, 2013, Malco told Wendy Williams that he wrote the rap, but did not perform it. He mentioned running into Paula Abdul and asking her, "Who keeps telling people that I'm the cat?" and she responded, "I do, it makes a better story." Malco said that Derrick "Delite" Stevens was the one that rapped the duet with Abdul.

Acting career

Malco was working as a music producer on The Pest when John Leguizamo, impressed by his dynamic personality, encouraged Romany to pursue acting. He went on to play Jay in Judd Apatow's 2005 film The 40 Year Old Virgin and Conrad Shepard in the Showtime television series Weeds. He played supporting roles in films such as Blades of Glory, The Love Guru, and Baby Mama.

He appeared in 2011's A Little Bit of Heaven and the Gulliver's Travels adaptation. In the fall of 2010, Malco appeared as a member of the ABC primetime one-hour drama No Ordinary Family.  He also appeared as a guest host on the popular YouTube series, Equals Three, on the episode "T-Painful".

In 2013, he played a concierge in the movie Last Vegas, alongside Robert De Niro, Morgan Freeman, Kevin Kline, and Michael Douglas.

Romany currently plays Rome Howard on the ABC series A Million Little Things.

Criticism of the media
On July 17, 2013, Malco wrote a piece for the Huffington Post on the Trayvon Martin verdict. In it, he chastised the media for sensationalizing the verdict to improve their ratings. Malco stated "Hundreds of Blacks die annually in South Side Chicago without even a blurb. Trayvon isn't in the mainstream news for any reason other than ratings and profit. The news coverage on the Zimmerman case almost implies that the killing of this young Black man is somehow an anomaly and I resent that." He also criticized the negative images of Black people by the same media that now purported to side with Martin. Malco called for an end to reinforcing negative stereotypes from within the Black community and suggests that "education, introspection, self-love and excellence are the only ways to overcome the wrath of ignorance."

Filmography

Film

Television

Podcasts

Awards and nominations

Nominations
Image Awards
 2008 – Outstanding Supporting Actor in a Comedy Series (Weeds)
 2007 – Outstanding Supporting Actor in a Comedy Series (Weeds)

MTV Movie Awards
 2006 – Best Breakthrough Performance (The 40-Year-Old Virgin)
 2006 – Best On-Screen Team (The 40-Year-Old Virgin) [Shared with Steve Carell, Paul Rudd, and Seth Rogen]

Screen Actors Guild Awards
 2007 – Outstanding Performance by an Ensemble in a Comedy Series (Weeds)

References

External links

1968 births
American male film actors
American rappers of Trinidad and Tobago descent
American male television actors
Living people
Male actors from New York City
American male voice actors
Rappers from Brooklyn
21st-century American male actors
21st-century American rappers